Tyna Barinaga (later Tony Barinaga; born 1946) is a former American badminton player who won national and international titles from the mid-1960s to the early 1970s. In 1964 Barinaga and fellow Port Angeles, Washington resident Caroline Jensen (Hein) became the first all-teenage team to capture the women's doubles title at the U.S. Open Championships. They won the Canadian Open women's doubles the following year. Barinaga shared the mixed doubles title at U.S. Open in 1966, and won both singles and doubles at the same tournament in 1968. Her last full season of competition, 1969–1970, was probably her best. After claiming a number of titles in Great Britain, she won all three events (singles, doubles, and mixed doubles) at the U.S Championships and women's singles at the Canadian Open. Barinaga was a member of three U.S. Uber Cup teams (1963, 1966,1969), the first of which retained the women's world team championship. She was inducted into the U.S. Badminton Hall of Fame (Walk of Fame) in 2003.

Achievements
Mixed doubles

References 

American female badminton players
1946 births
Living people
21st-century American women